Sven Dag Wicksell (22 October 1890, Stockholm – 20 February 1939, Lund) was a Swedish professor of statistics at Lund University.

Biography

In 1915 he received his Ph.D. (promotion), with supervisor Carl Charlier, from Lund University. There Wicksell became in 1915 a docent (lecturer) and in 1926 Lund University's first professor of statistics, a professorial chair that was created thanks to Wicksell's mentor Charlier. Wicksell did research on mathematical statistics, astronomical statistics and demographics. Upon his death in 1939, his professorial chair remained vacant until 1941 when Carl-Erik Quensel became his successor.

In 1928 Wicksell was an Invited Speaker at the ICM in Bologna. He was elected in 1939 as member number 870 of Kungliga Vetenskapsakademien.

His parents were the economist Knut Wicksell and the feminist Anna Bugge. Sven Wicksell was married from 1913 to Ingrid Anderson (1890–1979), daughter of a grain merchant. Their son Finn Wicksell became a prominent obstetrician and gynecologist.

Selected works

with Carl Vilhelm Ludwig Charlier:

References

External links
Sven Wicksell at libris.kb.se.

Swedish statisticians
Lund University alumni
Academic staff of Lund University
1890 births
1939 deaths